Bill O'Hara may refer to: 

Bill O'Hara (baseball) (1883–1931), American Major League Baseball outfielder
Bill O'Hara (footballer, born 1879) (1879–1957), Australian rules footballer for St Kilda
Bill O'Hara (footballer, born 1880) (1880–1946), Australian rules footballer for South Melbourne
Bill O'Hara (sailor) (born 1958), Irish Olympic sailor

See also
William O'Hara (1816–1899), Irish-born prelate of the Roman Catholic Church